Bryan Fogel is an American film director, producer, author, playwright, speaker and human rights activist, best known for the 2017 documentary Icarus, which won an Academy Award for Best Documentary Feature at the 90th Academy Awards in 2018.

Early life and education
Fogel was born in Denver, Colorado. He attended the Denver Jewish Day School. He graduated from East High School and the University of Colorado Boulder.

Career 
Fogel began his career in Hollywood pursuing stand-up comedy and acting. He had a small part in the 2009 Disney movie Race to Witch Mountain.

Fogel has given keynote speeches to organizations around the world including the Oslo Freedom Forum in 2019 and 2020 - Human Rights Foundation and has appeared on ABC Nightline, Charlie Rose, Seth Meyers, Joe Rogan, CNN, ESPN, Meet The Press, The View, NPR, BBC and has been featured in publications around the globe including The Guardian  and Financial Times. Fogel currently resides in Los Angeles.

Jewtopia 

Fogel developed, co-wrote, and initially starred in the play Jewtopia, an off-Broadway comedy about the dating lives of two young men seeking Jewish women, which was made into a feature film. The play opened in Los Angeles in 2003 and ran for 300 performances. It moved on in 2004 to the off-Broadway Westside Theater in New York, where it ran for more than three years and over a thousand performances before closing in April 2007. It is one of the longest-running and fastest-recouping productions in Off-Broadway history.

Fogel co-authored the book Jewtopia: The Chosen Guide for the Chosen People, with Sam Wolfson. The book was published by Hachette Book Group and Fogel appeared on ABC's The View in support of the book.

Fogel directed, co-wrote and produced the feature film adaptation of Jewtopia which was released in 2012. The film had its U.S. premiere as the opening night gala of the 13th Newport Beach International Film Festival.

Icarus 

The New York Times described Fogel's film Icarus as "Illuminating" and Variety magazine called it "A Game Changing Documentary." Icarus premiered at the Sundance Film Festival, where it won U.S. Documentary Special Jury Award "The Orwell Award" and the first ever "Audience Choice" Award of Sundance Film Festival London. The film was acquired in a $5 million sale by Netflix and launched globally on August 4, 2017. The film won Netflix its first Feature Documentary Oscar.

The Dissident

After Icarus, Fogel directed and produced the 2020 American documentary film The Dissident, which follows the assassination of Jamal Khashoggi and Saudi Arabia's efforts to control international dissent. It had its world premiere at the Sundance Film Festival on January 24, 2020 and was released on December 18, 2020, by Briarcliff Entertainment. Fogel's screenplay for The Dissident won the Writers Guild of America Award for Best Documentary Screenplay award at the 73rd Writers Guild of America Awards in 2020 and received a nomination for "Best Documentary" at the (BAFTA Awards) British Academy Film Awards in 2020.

Icarus: The Aftermath
Fogel completed Icarus: The Aftermath in 2022, a follow-up to the Oscar-winning doc Icarus. The film premiered that same year at the 49th Telluride Film Festival.

Filmography

References

External links
 

21st-century American dramatists and playwrights
American humorists
Living people
University of Colorado Boulder alumni
People from Denver
Jewish American dramatists and playwrights
Doping in Russia
Directors of Best Documentary Feature Academy Award winners
Film directors from Colorado
Year of birth missing (living people)
21st-century American Jews